The Uber-anatomy ontology (Uberon) is a  comparative anatomy ontology representing a variety of structures found in animals, such as lungs, muscles, bones, feathers and fins. These structures are connected to other structures via relationships such as part-of and develops-from. One of the uses of this ontology is to integrate data from different biological databases, and other species-specific ontologies such as the Foundational Model of Anatomy.

References

External links

 http://uberon.org

Biological databases
Comparative anatomy
Anatomical terminology
Ontology (information science)